Alix E. Harrow (born November 9, 1989) is a Hugo Award-winning American science fiction and fantasy writer. Her short fiction has been nominated for the Nebula Award, World Fantasy Award, and Locus Award, and in 2019 she won a Hugo Award for her story "A Witch's Guide to Escape: A Practical Compendium of Portal Fantasies". She has published under the name Alix Heintzman.

Life and career

Alix E. Harrow was born in 1989 in the United States and grew up in Kentucky. She enrolled at Berea College at age sixteen, where she completed a bachelor's degree in history in three years. She then went on to earn a master's degree in history from the University of Vermont. Before working as a full-time writer, Harrow was an academic historian who taught as an adjunct professor of African and African American history at Eastern Kentucky University.

Her first novel, The Ten Thousand Doors of January (2019), was received with critical acclaim and nominated for multiple awards, including the Hugo Award, Nebula Award, and World Fantasy Award for best novel. A second novel, The Once and Future Witches (2020), won a British Fantasy Award for Best Fantasy Novel (the Robert Holdstock Award). A more recent novella, A Spindle Splintered (2021), has been nominated for a Hugo Award for best novella. 

Harrow has also written short fiction for Shimmer, Strange Horizons, Tor.com, and Apex. This has produced a Hugo award winning 2018 short story called "A Witch's Guide to Escape: A Practical Compendium of Portal Fantasies" (published by Apex).

Harrow lives in Virginia with her husband, Nick Stiner, and two children.

Awards

Bibliography

Novels

 The Ten Thousand Doors of January (2019) – 
The Once and Future Witches (2020) –

Novellas 

A Spindle Splintered (2021) – 
 A Mirror Mended (2022) –

Short fiction
 "A Whisper in the Weld" (2014)
 "The Animal Women" (2015)
 "Dustbaby" (2015)
 "The Autobiography of a Traitor and a Half-Savage" (2016)
 "Patience and Not-Forsaken" (2016)
 "A Witch's Guide to Escape: A Practical Compendium of Portal Fantasies" (2018)
 "Do Not Look Back, My Lion" (2019)
 "The Sycamore and the Sybil" (2020)
 "Mr. Death" (2021)
 "The Long Way Up" (2022)

References

External links
 Official website
 
 Alix E. Harrow on GoodReads

1989 births
21st-century American women writers
American fantasy writers
Living people
Novelists from Kentucky
University of Vermont alumni
21st-century American novelists
21st-century American short story writers
American women novelists
American women short story writers
Hugo Award-winning writers